Andre Agassi was the defending champion, but was defaulted in his second round match against Cecil Mamiit for swearing at a line judge.

Mark Philippoussis won the title, defeating Mamiit 6–3, 6–2 in the final.

Seeds

Draw

Finals

Top half

Bottom half

References
Main draw

1999 ATP Tour
SAP Open